Ekrukh dam, is an earthfill dam on Adela river near north Solapur in the state of Maharashtra in India.

Specifications

Purpose
 Irrigation
 Water Supply

See also
 Dams in Maharashtra
 List of reservoirs and dams in India

References

Dams in Solapur district
Dams completed in 1871
1871 establishments in India